USJ can mean:

 Universal Studios Japan
 UEP Subang Jaya
 Université Saint-Joseph, a Lebanese private university founded in 1875
 University of Saint Joseph, a university in Macau
 United States of Japan, a fictional revolutionary Japan from the anime series Code Geass: Lelouch of the Rebellion
 Unforeseen Simulation Joint, a fictional arena used to train heroes for rescuing people in natural disasters "My Hero Academia"
 Urban Studies (journal)